Beljeanne was a  heavy lift ship that was built in 1946 for the British Ministry of Transport. She was completed in 1947 as Beljeanne for the Norwegian company Belships. In 1964 she was sold to a Panamanian company and renamed Southern Cross, being renamed Southern Hope in 1966 before a sale to a Filipino bank in 1968 and renaming to Virginia Second. She served until 1969, when she was scrapped.

Description
The ship was built in 1946 by Vickers-Armstrongs Ltd, Newcastle upon Tyne, Northumberland, England. She was yard number 95.

The ship was propelled by two steam turbines. The turbines were made by Metropolitan-Vickers, Manchester, Lancashire. They were rated at 6,800 nhp.

History
Empire Ethelbert was built for the Ministry of Transport, London. She was launched on 14 August 1946. Her port of registry was to be Barrow in Furness, Lancashie and the Code Letters GKMP were allocated. Empire Ethelbert was completed in January 1947 as Beljeanne for Belships Co Ltd, Oslo, Norway. The Code Letters LMCX were allocated. She was placed under the management of Christen Smith & Co, Oslo. In March 1964, Beljeanne was sold to Bacong Shipping Co SA, Panama City, Panama and renamed Southern Cross. She was operated under the management of Filipino company Southern Industrial Projects Inc. She was renamed Southern Hope in 1966. The ship was mortgaged to the Peoples Bank & Trust Co, Manila,  Philippines. In 1968, the ship was sold to the bank in lieu of debts, and she was renamed Virginia Second. She was operated under the management of M M Shipping Lines Inc, Manila. She served until 1969, arriving on 15 January at Aioi, Japan for scrapping.

References

External links
Photo of Beljeanne

1946 ships
Ships built on the River Tyne
Empire ships
Steamships of the United Kingdom
Merchant ships of the United Kingdom
Steamships of Norway
Merchant ships of Norway
Steamships of Panama
Merchant ships of Panama
Steamships of the Philippines
Merchant ships of the Philippines